In mathematics, the metaplectic group Mp2n is a double cover of the symplectic group Sp2n. It can be defined over either real or p-adic numbers. The construction covers more generally the case of an arbitrary local or finite field, and even the ring of adeles.

The metaplectic group has a particularly significant infinite-dimensional linear representation, the Weil representation. It was used by André Weil to give a representation-theoretic interpretation of theta functions, and is important in the theory of modular forms of half-integral weight and the theta correspondence.

Definition
The fundamental group of the symplectic Lie group Sp2n(R)  is infinite cyclic, so it has a unique connected double cover, which is denoted Mp2n(R) and called the metaplectic group.

The metaplectic group Mp2(R) is not a matrix group: it has no faithful finite-dimensional representations. Therefore, the question of its explicit realization is nontrivial. It has faithful irreducible infinite-dimensional representations, such as the Weil representation described below.

It can be proved that if F is any local field other than C, then the symplectic group Sp2n(F) admits a unique perfect central extension with the kernel Z/2Z, the cyclic group of order 2, which is called the metaplectic group over F.
It serves as an algebraic replacement of the topological notion of a 2-fold cover used when . The approach through the notion of central extension is useful even in the case of real metaplectic group, because it allows a description of the group operation via a certain cocycle.

Explicit construction for n = 1 
In the case , the symplectic group coincides with the special linear group SL2(R). This group biholomorphically acts on the complex upper half-plane by fractional-linear transformations,

  where 

is a real 2-by-2 matrix with the unit determinant and z is in the upper half-plane, and this action can be used to explicitly construct the metaplectic cover of SL2(R).

The elements of the metaplectic group Mp2(R) are the pairs (g, ε), where  and ε is a holomorphic function on the upper half-plane such that . The multiplication law is defined by:

    where 

That this product is well-defined follows from the cocycle relation . The map

is a surjection from Mp2(R) to SL2(R) which does not admit a continuous section. Hence, we have constructed a non-trivial 2-fold cover of the latter group.

Construction of the Weil representation
We first give a rather abstract reason why the Weil representation exists. The Heisenberg group has an irreducible unitary representation on a Hilbert space , that is, 

with the center acting as a given nonzero constant. The Stone–von Neumann theorem states that this representation is essentially unique: if  is another such representation, there exists an automorphism 
 such that .
and the conjugating automorphism is projectively unique, i.e., up to a multiplicative modulus 1 constant. So any automorphism of the Heisenberg group, inducing the identity on the center, acts on this representation —to be precise, the action is only well-defined up to multiplication by a non-zero constant.

However, the action is only defined up to multiplication by a nonzero constant, in other words, one can only map the automorphism of the group to the class .
A calculation shows that this central extension can be taken to be a double cover, and this double cover is the metaplectic group.

Now we give a more concrete construction in the simplest case of 
Mp2(R).  The Hilbert space H is then the space of all L2 functions on the reals.  The Heisenberg group is generated by translations and by multiplication by the functions eixy of x, for y real. Then the action of the metaplectic group on H is generated by the Fourier transform and multiplication by the functions exp(ix2y) of x, for y real.

Generalizations 
Weil showed how to extend the theory above by replacing ℝ by any locally compact abelian group G, which by Pontryagin duality is isomorphic to its dual (the group of characters).  The Hilbert space H is then the space of all L2 functions on G. The (analogue of) the Heisenberg group is generated by translations by elements of G, and multiplication by elements of the dual group (considered as functions from G to the unit circle).  There is an analogue of the symplectic group acting on the Heisenberg group, and this action lifts to a projective representation on H.  The corresponding central extension of the symplectic group is called the metaplectic group.

Some important examples of this construction are given by:

 G is a vector space over the reals of dimension n.  This gives a metaplectic group that is a double cover of the symplectic group Sp2n(R).
 More generally G can be a vector space over any local field F of dimension n. This gives a metaplectic group that is a double cover of the symplectic group Sp2n(F).
G is a vector space over the adeles of a number field (or global field).  This case is used in the representation-theoretic approach to automorphic forms.
G is a finite group. The corresponding metaplectic group is then also finite, and the central cover is trivial.  This case is used in the theory of theta functions of lattices, where typically G will be the discriminant group of an even lattice.
 A modern point of view on the existence of the linear (not projective) Weil representation over a finite field, namely, that it admits a canonical Hilbert space realization, was proposed by David Kazhdan. Using the notion of canonical intertwining operators suggested by Joseph Bernstein, such a realization was constructed by Gurevich-Hadani.

See also
Heisenberg group
Oscillator representation
Metaplectic structure
Reductive dual pair
Spin group, another double cover
Symplectic group
Theta function

Notes

References

Fourier analysis
Topology of Lie groups
Theta functions